Henry Ottinger House, also known as The Willows, is a historic home located near Hot Springs, Madison County, North Carolina.  It was built about 1855, and is a two-story, three-bay, vernacular Greek Revival style brick dwelling.  It has double-pile plan with hipped roof and paired interior chimneys. The front facade features a two-story, single-bay entrance portico.  Also on the property are the contributing major barn (1908), carriage house, and slaughter house.

It was listed on the National Register of Historic Places in 1986.

References

Houses on the National Register of Historic Places in North Carolina
Greek Revival houses in North Carolina
Houses completed in 1855
Houses in Madison County, North Carolina
National Register of Historic Places in Madison County, North Carolina